Tide is an American brand of laundry detergent manufactured and marketed by Procter & Gamble. Introduced in 1946, it is the highest-selling detergent brand in the world, with an estimated 14.3 percent of the global market.

Background 
The household chore of doing the laundry began to change with the introduction of washing powders in the 1880s. These new laundry products were pulverized soap. New cleaning-product marketing successes, such as the 1890s introduction of the N. K. Fairbank Company's Gold Dust Washing Powder (which used a breakthrough hydrogenation process in its formulation), and Hudson's heavily advertised product, Rinso, proved that there was a ready market for better cleaning agents. Henkel & Cie's "self-activating" (or self bleaching) cleaner, Persil; (introduced in 1907); the early synthetic detergent, BASF's Fewa (introduced in 1932); and Procter & Gamble's 1933 totally synthetic creation, Dreft (marketed for use on infant-wear) —all indicated significant advances in the laundry cleaning product market.

The detergent business was further revolutionized with the discovery of the alkylbenzene sulfonates, which, when combined with the use of chemical "builders", made machine washing with hard water possible. This presented Procter and Gamble with the opportunity to create a product such as Tide.

History 
The original Tide laundry detergent was a synthetic designed specifically for heavy-duty, machine cleaning (an advance over the milder cleaning capabilities of Fewa and Dreft detergent brands). Tide was first introduced in U.S. test markets in 1946 as the world's first heavy-duty detergent, with nationwide distribution accomplished in 1949. Tide claimed it was "America's Washday Favorite".  Authority was quickly gained in the U.S. detergent market, dwarfing the sales of Ivory Snow; and accelerating the demise of two of its main competing products, Rinso and Gold Dust Washing Powder, both then Lever Brothers brands. These other brands came in the more familiar soap-powder and soap-flake forms. Tide, however, came shaped like a white powdered bead. The line was expanded to include an orange-tinted clear liquid form in 1984. Today, most formulations of liquid Tide, both concentrated and regular, are dark blue, with the exception of "Tide Free", which is clear. Each year, Tide researchers duplicate the mineral content of water from all parts of the United States and wash 50,000 loads of laundry to test Tide detergent's consistency and performance.

In 2006, the development of Tide was designated an ACS National Historic Chemical Landmark in recognition of its significance as the first heavy-duty synthetic detergent.

, Tide has more than 30% of the liquid-detergent market, with more than twice as much in sales as the second-most-popular brand Gain, although it costs about 50% more than the average liquid detergent.

For the company's national and international experience in sustainable development, and eco-friendly products, the Environment Possibility Award conferred the "Environmental Heroes of the Year" to Tide in 2020.

In some areas, Tide has become such a hot commodity item, that criminals steal it from stores to resell. Police call the detergent "liquid gold" on the black market and it has been known to be traded or sold for illegal drugs.

Brand 
In a 2009 survey, consumers ranked Tide among the three brands they would be least likely to give up during the Great Recession. The Tide trademark is an easily recognized, distinctive orange-and-yellow bulls-eye. This original logo was designed by Donald Deskey, an architect and famous industrial designer. The logo was slightly modified for the product's fiftieth anniversary in 1996, and remains in use today.

Tide was the first product to be nationally packaged using Day-Glo colors—strikingly eye-catching when first introduced in 1959.

The Tide brand is on at least six powders and liquid detergents in the United States.

Product line 
Tide is marketed under various sub-brands, such as 2x Ultra Tide. In the late 1960s and early 1970s, it was branded as Tide XK (the XK standing for Xtra Kleaning), but it was rebranded simply as Tide later.

An addition to the Tide family, Tide Coldwater was formulated to remove stains while saving energy because it does not require hot or even warm water. Tide Free is marketed as being free from dyes or perfumes. Tide-To-Go is a product packaged in a pen-like format and intended to remove small stains on the spot, without further laundering.

In Puerto Rico and elsewhere in Latin America, the Tide formula is marketed under the name Ace (except in Ecuador and Panama, where it is sold under the Tide brand name) In Turkey, Tide is branded as Alo. In Poland, it is sold as Vizir. In Hong Kong, Malaysia, and Singapore, it is sold as Fab, a brand acquired in 2006 from Colgate-Palmolive.

Tide is sold in the UK as Daz, Vizir in Poland and France and Tide in Russia they have the marking "Daz/Vizir/Tide" on the back of the pods and bear the same distinctive blue pod design. This is not the same Tide pods as sold in North America given the difference in color of the pods.

Since 2012, Tide has sold Tide Pods, a line of laundry detergent pod, making an estimated 15% of sales. In late 2017, an Internet meme was popularized around the concept of eating Tide Pods and, as a result, people attempted the extremely dangerous "Tide Pods Challenge".

Sponsorships 

Tide has sponsored several NASCAR stock cars, notably the Chevrolet "Tide Ride" driven by Darrell Waltrip as #17 for Hendrick Motorsports. The relationship lasted from 1987 to 1990 and won the 1989 Daytona 500.  Waltrip left the team to form his own team. Tide then sponsored Ricky Rudd in the #5 car after Levi Garrett left Hendrick. Rudd drove for Hendrick until 1993, when he left the racing team, also to form his own team and taking the Tide sponsorship. Rudd Performance Motorsports ran from 1994 to 1999 and won the 4th Brickyard 400 in 1997. After Rudd became winless in his first time in 17 seasons, Tide left Rudd after being lured by Calvin Well's new team PPI Motorsports. The new team's number was 32, which the sum of 17, 5, and 10. Scott Pruett was the first driver but after DNQing 6 times and no Top 10s, Ricky Craven took over in 2001 and responded with a win at Martinsville Speedway. He went winless in 2002, but one year later, he won the closest race in NASCAR history at Darlington in the Carolina Dodge Dealers 400, rubbing with Kurt Busch for laps and with a margin-of-victory of 0.002 seconds.  After no Top 10s halfway through the 2004 season, Craven left PPI and was replaced by Bobby Hamilton Jr. for 2004 and 2005. Travis Kvapil ran for PPI in 2006 but with four DNQs.  Tide left the sport before it was going to sponsor one of Well's proposed Toyota teams in 2007. Tide was on Kevin Harvick's truck a few times, but Kroger was also promoting the car. Tide made its Cup series return in September 2016, when it sponsored Matt Kenseth's No. 20 car for a Darlington tribute scheme. Tide extended their sponsorship to Joe Gibbs Racing to three races in 2017.

References

Further reading

External links 
 

Laundry detergents
Cleaning product brands
Procter & Gamble brands
Products introduced in 1946
Trademarks